Megathous is a genus of click beetles in the family Elateridae.

European species
European species within this genus include:
 Megathous barrosi (Méquignon, 1932)
 Megathous ficcuzzensis (Buysson, 1912)
 Megathous fiorii Platia & Marini, 1990
 Megathous nigerrimus (Desbrochers des Loges, 1869)

References

Elateridae
Elateridae genera